Tesseraspis is a Lowermost Devonian fish characteristic of the Traquairaspis Fish Zone.

References 

Heterostraci genera
Devonian jawless fish
Fossils of Russia